The MacCarthy executive council was 7th executive council of British Ceylon. The government was led by Governor Charles Justin MacCarthy.

Executive council members

See also
 Cabinet of Sri Lanka

Notes

References

1860 establishments in Ceylon
1863 disestablishments in Ceylon
Cabinets established in 1860
Cabinets disestablished in 1863
Ceylonese executive councils
Ministries of Queen Victoria